Hayranidil Kadın (2 November 1846 – 26 November 1895; meaning 'The excellent heart') was a consort of Sultan Abdulaziz of the Ottoman Empire, and the mother of last caliph of the Ottoman Empire Abdulmejid II.

Life
Was of Circassian origin, Hayranıdil Kadın was born on 2 November 1846. She was celebrated as the most beautiful woman of the imperial household. The lack of information about her past and her family suggests that she was of humble or even slave origins: in fact, despite slavery had been abolished in the Ottoman Empire, Pertevniyal Sultan, mother of Abdülaziz, continued to select Caucasian slaves for the harem of his son.

She married Abdulaziz on 21 September 1865 in the Dolmabahçe Palace. She was given the title of "Third Kadın" and in 1875 of "Second Kadın". On 25 February 1867, she gave birth to her first child, a daughter, Nazime Sultan. One year later, on 29 May 1868, she gave birth to her second child, a son, Şehzade Abdulmejid (future Caliph Abdulmejid II) in the Beylerbeyi Palace.

Abdulaziz was deposed by his ministers on 30 May 1876, his nephew Murad V became the Sultan. He was transferred to Feriye Palace the next day. Hayranıdil, and other women of Abdulaziz's entourage didn't want to leave the Dolmabahçe Palace. So they were grabbed by hand and were sent out to the Feriye Palace. In the process, they were searched from head to toe and everything of value was taken from them. On 4 June 1876, Abdulaziz died under mysterious circumstances. In 1876 the new sultan, Abdulhamid II, freed Abdülaziz's consort and allowed Hayranidil to live in Ortaköy Palace.

Death
Hayranıdil Kadın died on 26 November 1895 in the Feriye Palace, Ortaköy at the age of forty-nine, and was buried in the mausoleum of Sultan Mahmud II, located at Divan Yolu street, Istanbul.

Issue

See also
Kadın (title)
Ottoman dynasty
Ottoman family tree
List of consorts of the Ottoman Sultans

References

Sources

External links

1846 births
1898 deaths
19th-century consorts of Ottoman sultans